Hanno Essén (born 27 September 1948) is an associate professor of theoretical physics and a lecturer at the Swedish Royal Institute of Technology and former chairman of the Swedish Skeptics Society.

Hanno Essén received his Ph.D. at Stockholm University in 1979. The thesis was titled Topics in Molecular Mechanics and touched the approximate separations of nuclear and electron motion and the vibrational and rotational motion of molecules. He continued his research as a postdoc at Oxford University, England, for one year, and then for two years at McMaster University in Hamilton, Canada. After some years as a temporary lecturer at the Physics Department at Stockholm University and at the Quantum Chemistry, Uppsala University, Essen got permanent employment as a lecturer at the Mechanics dept at the Royal Institute of Technology in 1988. Since 1990 he has been Director of undergraduate studies (Studierektor) at the Department of Mechanics, Royal Institute of Technology. He is member of the Editorial Board of the European Journal of Physics since September 2006 and has been Chairman of the Swedish Skeptics Society for three years (from 19 April 2008 to 2 April 2011).

References

External links 
 http://www.mech.kth.se/~hanno/

Swedish physicists
Academic staff of the KTH Royal Institute of Technology
Stockholm University alumni
Swedish skeptics
Living people
1948 births